Alizée Baron (born 6 August 1992) is a French freestyle skier, specializing in ski cross, and alpine skier.

Career
Baron competed at the 2014 Winter Olympics for France. She finished 19th in the seeding run for the ski cross event. In the first round, she finished third in her heat, failing to advance.

As of September 2015, her best showing at the Freestyle World Championships is 7th, in the 2013 ski cross.

Baron made her Freestyle World Cup debut in December 2011. As of September 2015, she has six World Cup podium finishes, with her best a victory at Åre in 2014–15. Her best Freestyle World Cup overall finish in ski cross is 2nd, in 2014–15.

World Cup podiums

References

External links

1992 births
Living people
Olympic freestyle skiers of France
Freestyle skiers at the 2014 Winter Olympics
Freestyle skiers at the 2018 Winter Olympics
Sportspeople from Montpellier
French female alpine skiers
French female freestyle skiers
Université Savoie-Mont Blanc alumni
X Games athletes